Trosti is a rural locality (a khutor) in Prilepsky Selsoviet Rural Settlement, Konyshyovsky District, Kursk Oblast, Russia. Population:

Geography 
The khutor is located on the Platavka River (a left tributary of the Svapa River), 53 km from the Russia–Ukraine border, 68 km west of Kursk, 7.5 km south-west of the district center – the urban-type settlement Konyshyovka, 7.5 km from the selsoviet center – Prilepy.

 Climate
Trosti has a warm-summer humid continental climate (Dfb in the Köppen climate classification).

Transport 
Trosti is located 51 km from the federal route  Ukraine Highway, 53.5 km from the route  Crimea Highway, 40 km from the route  (Trosna – M3 highway), 29.5 km from the road of regional importance  (Fatezh – Dmitriyev), 6.5 km from the road  (Konyshyovka – Zhigayevo – 38K-038), 1.5 km from the road  (Lgov – Konyshyovka), 1.5 km from the road of intermunicipal significance  (Shirkovo – Khrylyovka – Shustovo), 5.5 km from the nearest railway halt Maritsa (railway line Navlya – Lgov-Kiyevsky).

The rural locality is situated 74 km from Kursk Vostochny Airport, 159 km from Belgorod International Airport and 277 km from Voronezh Peter the Great Airport.

References

Notes

Sources

Rural localities in Konyshyovsky District